Irwin Swack (born West Salem, Ohio, November 8, 1916; died January 2, 2006) was an American composer of contemporary classical music.

He held degrees from the Cleveland Institute of Music (where he studied violin, graduating with a B.M. in 1939), the Juilliard School, Northwestern University (master's degree), and Columbia University (doctorate). He studied with Henry Cowell (at Columbia University), Gunther Schuller (at Tanglewood), Vittorio Giannini (at Juilliard), and Paul Creston (at Columbia University). His music was recorded on the Centaur, CRS, Opus One, and Living Artist Recordings labels.

His music is published by Carl Fischer, Shawnee Press, Theodore Presser, and Galaxy Music.

His last residence was in Bellmore, New York.

Works
Duets for Violin and Viola
Fantasie Concertante, string orchestra
Profiles, clarinet, violin and cello
Sonata for Flute and Piano
String Quartet no. 1
String Quartet no. 2
String Quartet no. 3
String Quartet no. 4
String Quartet no. 5
Symphony no. 1
Symphony no. 2
The Visions of Isaiah, mixed choir and orchestra

External links
Irwin Swack page
Irwin Swack page from American Music Center site

1916 births
2006 deaths
American male classical composers
American classical composers
20th-century classical composers
People from West Salem, Ohio
Northwestern University alumni
Columbia University alumni
Cleveland Institute of Music alumni
People from Bellmore, New York
Pupils of Gunther Schuller
20th-century American composers
20th-century American male musicians
Classical musicians from Ohio
Classical musicians from New York (state)
Pupils of Henry Cowell